Lorenzo Batlle Pacheco (4 March 1897 – 3 December 1954) was a Uruguayan political figure and journalist.

Background 
Pacheco was born in Montevideo.  He was a journalist on the newspaper El Día and a prominent member of the Uruguayan Colorado Party. He was a son of Matilde Pacheco and long-serving President of Uruguay José Batlle y Ordóñez. Brother of Rafael and César Batlle Pacheco.

Deputy; Senator 

Batlle Pacheco was elected as a Deputy in 1927. In 1931 he was elected as a Senator, and was subsequently re-elected to the Senate in 1947.

Batlle Pacheco died in 1954, while serving as a Senator.

See also 

 Politics of Uruguay
 List of political families#Uruguay

References 

1897 births
1954 deaths
People from Montevideo
Uruguayan people of Catalan descent
Uruguayan people of Scottish descent
Children of presidents of Uruguay
Colorado Party (Uruguay) politicians
Maria Moors Cabot Prize winners
Members of the Chamber of Representatives of Uruguay
Members of the Senate of Uruguay
Uruguayan vice-presidential candidates